The Fort Worth Museum of Science and History is located on 1600 Gendy Street, Fort Worth, Texas 76107 in the city's Cultural District. It was opened in 1945 as the Fort Worth Children's Museum and moved to its current location in 1954. In 1968, the museum adopted its current name. Attractions at the museum include the Noble Planetarium, the Omni Theater, and the Star's Café, in addition to both traveling and permanent science and history exhibits.

In the fall of 2007, the museum was closed for renovations. During construction the museum had a limited presence in the National Cowgirl Museum and Hall of Fame next door, with a temporary "2 museums, 1 roof" campaign. The entire museum was moved into a new building at the same site in 2009. The new building was designed by architects Legorreta + Legorreta with Gideon Toal and consists of 166,000 square feet. The original Omni Theater and lobby were refurbished but left mostly intact. In addition, the museum left one tree from the original museum courtyard undisturbed and built the museum around it, leaving the tree in an open area called the Heritage Courtyard. The total maximum occupancy is 3,369 individuals. The museum's opening after renovations was on Friday, November 20, 2009.

Permanent exhibits

Fort Worth Children's Museum
The Children’s Museum gallery targets the Museum’s youngest guests – age birth to 8 – and those who care for them. The purpose is to encourage opportunities for children to play, knowing that at this age level, children are learning through play.

DinoLabs & DinoDig
Learn about dinosaurs that roamed in your own backyard millions of years ago and bring them to life using creativity and imagination!  In DinoLabs you’ll discover dinosaur skeletons native to North Texas and cutting-edge technology that brings the experience to life! Explore DinoDig and see what you discover in a replica field site.

Cattle Raisers Museum
A "museum within a museum," the Cattle Raisers Museum is located on the second floor of the Fort Worth Museum of Science and History. The 10,000-square-foot exhibition is dedicated to preserving and celebrating the vital history and science of the cattle industry. The experience tells the story of the cattle industry from its origins among the West’s early Spanish settlers, through the heyday of the legendary drovers, all the way to today’s modern range technology.

Energy Blast
Energy Blast tells the dynamic story of energy resources in North Texas through a unique combination of science and history.  Physics, technology, and innovative thinking spring to life as you are asked to explore geophysical formations, calculate drilling depths and directions and experiment with new resources.

Innovation Studios
Innovation Studios are located off the Museum’s central corridor. These five glass-walled studios – which surround Innovation Gallery – are called "Inventor," "Doodler," "Designer," "Imaginer," and "Explorer." They are 6,000 square feet of flexible, engaging learning spaces.

150 Years of Fort Worth
"150 Years of Fort Worth" traced Fort Worth's development, from its beginning as a frontier outpost, through its youth as a cattle town, to the present day. Created by the Fort Worth Museum of Science and History, in cooperation with City Center Development Co., the exhibit was housed in the historic Fire Station No. 1, which was built in 1907. Fire Station No. 1 is located in the City Center complex at the northeast corner of Second and Commerce streets. This exhibit closed on February 19, 2016.

Noble Planetarium
The Noble Planetarium is named for Charlie Mary Noble, an educator, astronomer, and scientist. The 80-seat planetarium shows a combination of live and recorded shows, including "Dream to Fly," a show about the history of aviation. The newly-renovated Noble Space Gallery hosts a collection of artifacts from the space race, including many that traveled to space.

Omni Theater, an IMAX Dome

Since its opening on April 19, 1983, the Omni has earned a reputation as an engaging learning environment. More than 10 million guests have journeyed to remote islands of the Pacific, explored deep under the ocean surface, splashed down the mighty Colorado of the Grand Canyon, stampeded across the vast Serengeti, traveled through the galaxy to the craters of Mars, and inched up the treacherous peaks of Mount Everest without ever leaving their Omni seats!

With an eight-story domed screen and 30-degree stadium seating, the Omni Theater is the largest IMAX dome in the United States west of the Mississippi River. The Omni’s 120-foot-wide screen places the audience in the center of the action. The theater embodies a revolutionary concept in film presentation, which combines the drama of oversized film, state-of-the-art projection equipment, innovative tilt-domed theater architecture and the most sophisticated production techniques to create unique cinematic experiences.

Museum School

See also
 Fort Worth Flyover, a short IMAX film commissioned by the museum and traditionally shown before Omni Theater movies
 CSI: The Experience, an exhibit developed by the museum and its partners
 List of museums in North Texas
 Heard Natural Science Museum and Wildlife Sanctuary
 Perot Museum of Nature and Science

References

External links

The architecture of Fort Worth Museum

History museums in Texas
IMAX venues
Museums in Fort Worth, Texas
Natural history museums in Texas
Planetaria in the United States
Paleontology in Texas
Science museums in Texas
Children's museums in Texas